Nicolás Esteban Medina Ríos (born 28 March 1987) is a Chilean former professional footballer who played as a forward.

Club career
Born in Santiago, Medina began his football career at Club Universidad de Chile, being promoted to the first team in 2006. Also during that year, he received an offer from Real Madrid, but did not accept it because he still wanted to develop his game before making the move to Europe.

In the following summer, Medina signed with another club from Spain, CA Osasuna, in a four-year contract and a €400.000 fee. He was immediately loaned to Segunda División side SD Eibar, where he was played very rarely (ten matches out of 42).

For the 2008–09 season, Medina was again loaned by the Navarrese to another team in that tier, SD Huesca. He appeared slightly more than the previous campaign, contributing three goals to the Aragonese's survival.

On 27 November 2009, Medina moved clubs again, still owned by Osasuna, joining CD Castellón in a season-long move. He definitely cut ties with the former in the 2010 winter transfer window, signing with PFC Akademik Sofia from Bulgaria.

Medina returned to his country in 2012, going on to represent Curicó Unido (two spells), Deportes Naval, San Marcos de Arica and Rangers de Talca. He scored eight goals from 34 appearances in his first season with San Marcos, helping to promotion to Primera División as champions.

On 11 August 2017, aged 30, Medina returned to Spain after signing with amateurs Villarrubia CF. After a fleeting spell in Sweden with Arameisk-Syrianska IF, he took his game to the Andorran Primera Divisió with FC Lusitanos, FC Santa Coloma and Inter Club d'Escaldes. As a curiosity, in his last club he used "1+8" as squad numer, just like Iván Zamorano at Inter Milan in 1998.

On 7 October 2021, Medina announced his official retirement after 16 years of professional career as a football player.

International career
Medina represented Chile at under-20 level, playing all the matches at the 2007 South American Youth Championship and netting five times as his team finished fourth and qualified for that year's FIFA U-20 World Cup. He helped the nation to the third place in the finals held in Canada, scoring in the opening game against the hosts and against the Democratic Republic of the Congo.

Managerial career
In October 2021, Medina joined UD Montijo as an assistant coach of the B-team.

Honours

Club
San Marcos
Primera B de Chile: 2013–14

Santa Coloma
Andorran Supercup: 2019

International
Chile U20
FIFA U-20 World Cup third place: 2007

References

External links

1987 births
Living people
Footballers from Santiago
Chilean footballers
Chile under-20 international footballers
Chilean expatriate footballers
Association football forwards
Chilean Primera División players
Primera B de Chile players
Universidad de Chile footballers
Curicó Unido footballers
Naval de Talcahuano footballers
San Marcos de Arica footballers
Rangers de Talca footballers
Segunda División players
Tercera División players
CA Osasuna players
SD Eibar footballers
SD Huesca footballers
CD Castellón footballers
Villarrubia CF players
First Professional Football League (Bulgaria) players
Akademik Sofia players
Ettan Fotboll players
Arameisk-Syrianska IF players
Primera Divisió players
FC Lusitanos players
FC Santa Coloma players
Inter Club d'Escaldes players
Expatriate footballers in Spain
Expatriate footballers in Bulgaria
Expatriate footballers in Sweden
Expatriate footballers in Andorra
Chilean expatriate sportspeople in Spain
Chilean expatriate sportspeople in Bulgaria
Chilean expatriate sportspeople in Sweden
Chilean expatriate sportspeople in Andorra
Chilean football managers
Chilean expatriate football managers
Expatriate football managers in Spain
People from Santiago